The 1957 Vanderbilt Commodores football team represented Vanderbilt University in the 1957 NCAA University Division football season. The Commodores were led by head coach Art Guepe in his fifth season and finished the season with a record of five wins, three losses and one tie (5–3–2 overall, 3–3–1 in the SEC).

Schedule

References

Vanderbilt
Vanderbilt Commodores football seasons
Vanderbilt Commodores football